is a Japanese former swimmer who competed in the 2000 Summer Olympics in the 1500 m freestyle.

References

1982 births
Living people
Japanese male freestyle swimmers
Olympic swimmers of Japan
Swimmers at the 2000 Summer Olympics
21st-century Japanese people